The Laurel Awards was an American cinema awards system established to honor films, actors, actresses, producers, directors, and composers. This award was created by the Motion Picture Exhibitor magazine, and ran from 1948 to 1971 (with the exception of 1969).

The Laurel Awards were determined by both American and Canadian film buyers. After the vote, the results were published in the magazine and each winner was given a golden plaque.

Awardees
 Best Picture
 Patton: 1971, not awarded any other year

 Best Drama Performance
 Joan Crawford: 1953  

Best Male Performance
 James Stewart: The Stratton Story 1950

Best Female Performance
 June Allyson: The Stratton Story 1950

Top Female Star
 Doris Day: 1958, 1959, 1960, 1961, 1962, 1963, 1964 
 Elizabeth Taylor: 1965, 1966
 Julie Andrews: 1967, 1968
 Katharine Hepburn: 1970, 1971

Top Male Star
 Rock Hudson: 1958, 1959, 1960, 1962, 1963
 Burt Lancaster: 1961
 Cary Grant: 1964, 1966
 Jack Lemmon: 1965, 1967
 Paul Newman: 1968, 1970
 Dustin Hoffman: 1971

Top Male Personality
Peter O'Toole: Lawrence of Arabia 1963

Top Producer / Director
 Cecil B. DeMille: 1949, 1950, 1951, 1952, 1953, 1954, 1955, 1956, 1957, 1958
 Alfred Hitchcock: 1959, 1960, 1961, 1962, 1964, 1966, 1970, 1971
 Billy Wilder: 1963
 Mervyn LeRoy: 1965
 Robert Wise: 1967, 1968

Top Director
 Fred Zinnemann: 1958, 1959, 1961, 1962, 1963, 1964
 Vincente Minnelli: 1960
 George Cukor: 1965
 David Lean: 1966
 Henry Hathaway: 1967 
 Norman Jewison: 1968
 Mike Nichols: 1970, 1971

 Musical Performance, Male

Elvis Presley: 1966

References

External links

American film awards
Awards established in 1948
Awards disestablished in 1971